Calliostoma joanneae is a species of sea snail, a marine gastropod mollusk in the family Calliostomatidae.

References

External links
 USNM Invertebrate Zoology Mollusca Collection
 World Register of Marine Species

joanneae
Gastropods described in 1971